Honourable Justice
Khalil-ur-Rehman Ramday (Punjabi) is a Pakistani jurist who served as judge of the Supreme Court of Pakistan. He remained permanent judge of Supreme Court from 2002 to 2010. He was born in Lahore on 13 January 1945. His late brother Chaudhary Muhammad Farooq had served as the Attorney General of Pakistan. His younger brother Asad-ur-Rehman Ramday, a politician, was elected as a Member of the National Assembly three times on a Pakistan Muslim League (Nawaz) (PML-N) ticket and served as a Federal minister as well.

Education

After receiving his early education in different schools of the Punjab, he matriculated from Central Model School, Lahore, and joined Government College, Lahore from where he migrated to Gordon College, Rawalpindi, on account of his father's posting in the Federal Ministry of Law.

At Gordon College, Rawalpindi, he was the captain of the college tennis team. He was judged the best English and Urdu debater of the college. He also became the editor of the college magazine, "The Gordonian" and was later elected, un-opposed, as the president of the college Minerva Club.

After graduation, he joined the Punjab University Law College at Lahore, where he became secretary of the Punjab University Law Society, and the editor of the college magazine, "Al-Mizan". He was declared the best English debater of 1968 in the Punjab University after winning the "Krishan Kishore Grover Goodwill Gold Medal Declamation Contest". He graduated in 1968 with a top honours for best all round activities in academics, sports and debates.

Khalil ur Rehman Ramday himself was appointed Advocate General of Punjab in 1987 when PML-N leader Mian Nawaz Sharif was Chief Minister of the province. Before that he was serving as Deputy Advocate General of province since 1984. He was among a large number of judges who were appointed in different high courts just before 1988 elections in anticipation of PPP's victory. The move was seen to be aimed at denying PPP government right to nominate judges in the courts.

Personal life

Khalil-ur-Rehman Ramday (where Ramday is a sub caste of Arains) was married to the daughter of former chief justice of Pakistan Justice Yaqoob Ali Khan, Quratulain Ramday (late). Mrs. Ramday was the chairperson of the Asia Chapter of Asia Pacific Cultural Center for UNESCO (ACCU) and the Punjab chapter of All Pakistan Women Association (APWA). She was also a member of the board of governors of Queen Mary College Lahore. Mrs. Ramday died on Saturday, 9 January 2010, and was survived by her son, Mustafa and daughter, Aamena.

Aamena is married to Mr. Muhammad Aurangzeb, son of Justice Ramday's elder brother Mr. Muhammad Farooq, a former attorney general of Pakistan. Aamena and Zeb have twin children, Ismaeel and Jahan Ara, born on 5 January 1997. The twins are studying in the United World College of Singapore where Zeb is working as the CEO Global Corporate Bank Asia Pacific at J.P. Morgan.

Mustafa is married to Aasma, the daughter of Ch. Ahmad Saeed, who was the chairman of Service Group of Pakistan, and a former chairman of Pakistan International Airlines. Mustafa and Aasma have two sons named Asfandyar born on 15 January 2005, and Amnaan born on 3 August 2013. Asfandyar is now studying at Marlborough College in England. Mustafa is a successful lawyer in Pakistan, and managing partner of Ramday Law Associates.

The family of Khalil-ur-Rehman Ramday has been associated with Pakistan Muslim League (Nawaz) for many years. His elder brother Ch. Asad-ur-Rehman has been contesting elections for National Assembly on PML/IJI/PML-N ticket since 1988 and also served as a federal minister. Ch. Asad-ur-Rehman contested the 2008 elections on a PML-N ticket and stood a close third in a three way PPP, PML-Q PML-N contest. 

His late brother Farooq also aserved as Advocate General of Punjab under PML-N government. His nephew Muhammad Raza Farooq (late) served as Advocate General Punjab again under a PML-N government. Muhammad Raza Farooq died at a young age from a fatal heart attack in his Marriott hotel room in Islamabad, on Friday, 14 May 2010. Brigadier Anwar-ul-Haq Ramday was also Justice Ramday's nephew, who laid down his life in the terrorist attack on G.H.Q. Rawalpindi in 2009.

Justice Ramday's younger brother, Usman Mahmood, has spent his successful career working in the Middle-East, and is CFO of Zahid Group, and CEO of AJIL Financial Services Company.

Professional career

Justice Ramday joined the legal profession at Lahore and enrolled as an advocate of the subordinate Courts in 1969. In 1971, he became an advocate of the High Court and in 1976 as an advocate of the Supreme Court.

In April 1976, he was appointed Assistant Advocate General of the Punjab, was promoted to Additional Advocate General in 1984, and was finally appointed as the Advocate General in March 1987.

Judicial career

In October 1988, Justice Ramday was elevated to the bench of the Lahore High Court and was promoted to the judge of the Supreme Court of Pakistan in January 2002. He became famous for presiding over the bench in the Chief Justice of Pakistan Iftikhar Muhammad Chaudhry versus the Government of Pakistan in 2007.

On 3 November 2007, Chief of the Army declared emergency and issued a Provisional Constitutional Order (PCO). A seven panel Supreme Court bench headed by Chief Justice Iftikhar Muhammad Chaudhry declared emergency as illegal and passed order that no judge of any superior court shall take oath on PCO. Justice Ramday refused to take oath on PCO as per ruling of Supreme Court. He was declared to be not holding office of the justice any more. During the unrest that followed the imposition of emergency, he was placed under house arrest, along with many other judges of the Supreme and High Courts who had refused to take oath under the Provisional Constitutional Order.

Justice Ramday was restored to the bench of Supreme Court on 17 March 2009 as a result of historic movement that lasted for two years.

Services
Justice Ramday has remained a visiting assistant professor at the Punjab University Law College, Lahore and is a member of the visiting faculty of the Civil Services Academy of Pakistan and the National Institute of Public Administration (NIPA) at Lahore since 1982. He regularly delivers lectures at the National Defence University, Islamabad, the Administrative Staff College of Pakistan, the Naval War College and the Air Force War College of Pakistan.

He has also been on the board of governors of the Lahore University of Management Sciences (LUMS) and the Lahore School of Economics and is now the chairperson of Shalamar Medical and Dental College (SMDC -LUMS). In addition, he has been a member of the syndicate of the Islamia University, Bahawalpur, and the Agriculture University, Faisalabad. He is a member of the board of governors of the Air University and the University of Modern Languages and Disciplines, Islamabad, and is a member of the syndicate of Quaid-e-Azam University, Islamabad.

In recognition of his services in the field of education especially the legal branch of education and the administration of justice, in May 2005, he was honoured with an honorary degree of Doctor of Laws by the Guru Nanak Dev University, Amritsar, which is rated amongst the top ten universities of India.

He has the honour of addressing the Gurukul Kangri University at Haridwar in India, where he had been invited to talk about inter-faith harmony. On the same topic, he addressed the Rotary International South Asia Goodwill Summit, 2007 held at Delhi in February 2007.

References 

1945 births
Living people
Pakistani lawyers
Pakistani judges
Central Model School, Lahore alumni
Government College University, Lahore alumni
Government Gordon College alumni
Judges of the Lahore High Court
Justices of the Supreme Court of Pakistan
Punjab University Law College alumni
People from Lahore
Punjabi people
Academic staff of the National Defence University, Pakistan